The lac Starr (English: Starr Lake) is a freshwater body in the head area of the Moncouche River (via the lac Moncouche), in the unorganized territory of Belle-Rivière, in the Lac-Saint-Jean-Est Regional County Municipality, in the administrative region from Saguenay–Lac-Saint-Jean, in the province of Quebec, in Canada. Lac Starr is located just north of the northwestern limit of the Laurentides Wildlife Reserve. Its location is almost at the limit of the administrative regions of Saguenay–Lac-Saint-Jean and Capitale-Nationale.

Many forest roads surround the Starr Lake area for forestry and recreational tourism activities.

Forestry is the main economic activity in the sector; recreational tourism, second.

The surface of Lake Starr is usually frozen from the beginning of December to the end of March, however the safe circulation on the ice is generally done from mid-December to mid-March.

Geography 
The main hydrographic slopes near Lake Starr are:
 North side: Huard Lake, Métabetchouane River, rivière aux Canots;
 East side: Contourné stream, rivière aux Canots;
 South side: Lac aux Écorces, Métascouac Lake, Contourné stream, rivière aux Montagnais;
 West side: Métabetchouane River, Rivière de la Chaine.

Lake Starr features is landlocked between the mountains.
  north-east of the mouth of Moncouche Lake;
  north-east of the confluence of the Moncouche River and the Métabetchouane River;
  north-east of Métabetchouane Lake;
  north-east of Kiskissink station of the Canadian National railway;
  to the east of route 155, connecting La Tuque to Chambord;
  south-east of the confluence of the Métabetchouane River and Lac Saint-Jean.

Toponymy 
The toponym "lac Starr" was formalized on August 28, 1973, by the Commission de toponymie du Québec.

Notes and references

See also 
 Lac-Saint-Jean-Est Regional County Municipality
 Belle-Rivière, an unorganized territory
 Laurentides Wildlife Reserve
 Saint-Véran Lake
 Moncouche Lake
 Moncouche River
 Métabetchouane River
 Lac Saint-Jean
 Saguenay River
 St. Lawrence River
 List of lakes of Canada

Lakes of Saguenay–Lac-Saint-Jean
Lac-Saint-Jean-Est Regional County Municipality
Laurentides Wildlife Reserve